Marta Ortega Pérez (born 1984) is the daughter of Amancio Ortega and was appointed chair of Inditex as of December 2021. Ortega replaced Pablo Isla, who was chair and CEO of Inditex since 2011. In April 2022, she will become president of the company.

Career 
Ortega studied at La Coruña and continued her baccalaureate education in Switzerland. She studied business in the European business school of the University of London and graduated in 2007, with a specialty in international entrepreneurship. The same year, she began to work at Inditex, at the London Zara store in Chelsea, then other locations and departments in the business. She currently works at the Intidex headquarters in Arteijo, Spain, for the women's product and design department, collaborating with Beatriz Padín.

In Arteijo, Ortega works with her father, Inditex founder Amancio Ortega, introducing new ways to communicate with the public. Since 2015, she has been on the board of directors of the Amancio Ortega Foundation. The foundation's scholarship program was modified due to the COVID-19 pandemic per an angreement with the Massachusetts Institute of Technology (MIT)

In November 2021 it was announced that in 1 April she would be named president of Inditex, succeeding Pablo Isla. Her appointment caused the company's share price to fall sharply. In her role, she will be expected to address the company's reputation of alleged forced labor and environmental impact.

Personal life 
Ortega has two children, a son and a daughter. She was previously married to Sergio Álvarez Moya, with whom she had her son, and is currently married to Carlos Torretta, a public relations employee at Inditex, with whom she has a daughter born in 2020. For her wedding to Torretta, she wore a Valentino gown.

References 

21st-century Spanish businesswomen
21st-century Spanish businesspeople
Living people
1984 births